Way Out West is a 1930 American pre-Code parody film, directed by Fred Niblo, starring William Haines, Leila Hyams, Polly Moran, and Ralph Bushman. It tells the story of Windy, a con man who cheats a group of cowboys out of their money. When they discover his cheating and learn that he has been robbed, they force him to work on a ranch until he has paid his debt.

Plot
Windy, a sideshow barker, cheats a group of cowboys out of their pay, but is then robbed himself. When the cowboys discover they have been cheated, they initially decide to hang him, then decide to make him work off his debt. He falls in love with ranch owner Molly, and when he saves her life after she is bitten by a rattlesnake, he wins her heart.

Cast
 William Haines as Windy
 Leila Hyams as Molly Rankin
 Polly Moran as Pansy
 Cliff Edwards as Trilby
 Ralph Bushman as Steve (as Francis X. Bushman Jr.)
 Vera Marshe as La Belle Rosa
 Charles Middleton as Buck Rankin
 Jack Pennick as Pete
 Buddy Roosevelt as Tex
 Jay Wilsey as Hank
 Catherine Moylan as Carnival Show Girl

Production
Way Out West was made on a budget of $413,000, one of the more expensive William Haines vehicles.

Response
The New York Times deemed Way Out West "an impertinent, moderately comic affair tinctured with slapstick and romance". The film made a profit of $84,000, making it one of the less profitable of Haines's films of the period.

Gay film historians, noting the homosexuality of William Haines, suggest that Way Out West is "one of the gayest films ever made". Haines biographer William J. Mann cites latent homoeroticism and inside gay humor throughout the film. In one particular example, viewed in light of the Pansy Craze that was beginning to reach Hollywood, Windy is mistaken for the cook Pansy. When called by her name, he replies "I'm the wildest pansy you ever picked!" Richard Barrios, author of Screened Out: Playing Gay in Hollywood from Edison to Stonewall, concurs: "For anyone seeking gay text or subtext in any of Haines's movies, this is the one to study."

References

External links
 Way Out West at the Internet Movie Database
 Way Out West at Turner Classic Movies

1930 films
1930s Western (genre) comedy films
American LGBT-related films
Metro-Goldwyn-Mayer films
American Western (genre) comedy films
American black-and-white films
Films directed by Fred Niblo
1930s LGBT-related films
1930 comedy films
1930s American films